The Unremarkable Juanquini (Spanish and Original Name is Chichipatos) is a Colombian comedy streaming television series starring Antonio Sanint, Maria Cecilia Sanchez, Julián Cerati, Mariana Gómez and Júlio César Herrera.

The first season premiered on Netflix on 15 May 2020, followed by a second season which premiered on 30 April 2021.

Premise
The series revolves around a magician, Juanquini (Antonio Sanint), who pulls a trick that makes a most wanted criminal disappear.

Cast
 Antonio Sanint as Juan Morales 'Juanquini'
 María Cecilia Sánchez as Margot
 Julián Cerati as Samuel
 Mariana Gómez as Monica
 Júlio César Herrera as El Capi González
 El Mindo as Lucho
 Jacques Toukhmanian as Queiroz
 Cristian Villamil as Ortiz
 Yurico Londoño as Agente Smith
 Biassini Segura as El Ñato

Episodes

Season 1 (2020)

Season 2 (2021)

Release
The Unremarkable Juanquini  was released on 15 May 2020 on Netflix.

References

External links
 
 

Spanish-language Netflix original programming
2020 Colombian television series debuts
2020s comedy television series
Colombian comedy television series